Don Stenberg (born September 30, 1948) is an American lawyer and politician who served as the 31st Attorney General of Nebraska from 1991 to 2003 and 43rd Treasurer of Nebraska from 2011 to 2019. A member of the Republican Party, he previously was legal counsel to Governor Charles Thone from 1979 to 1983.

He unsuccessfully ran for Lieutenant Governor of Nebraska in 1978; Attorney General of Nebraska in 1986; and the United States Senate in 1996, 2000, 2006, and 2012.

Early life, education, and law career 
Stenberg was born and raised in Tekamah, Nebraska. To pay for college, he detasseled corn, hauled bales, mowed lawns, and life guarded at the local swimming pool. After graduating from University of Nebraska–Lincoln (1970), Harvard Law School (1974), and Harvard Business School (1974) he practiced law in Lincoln.

Early political career (1978–1989)

1978 run for Lieutenant Governor 
In 1978, Stenberg ran for Lieutenant Governor of Nebraska, coming in fourth in the Republican primary with just 13% of the vote. Roland A. Luedtke won the primary with a plurality of 31%.

Thone administration 
In 1979, he was named as Legal Counsel to Republican Governor of Nebraska Charles Thone.  Don has also served as Director of the Governor's Policy Research Office, Assistant to the Governor, and Director of the Department of Administrative Services.

1986 run for Attorney General 
He first ran for Nebraska Attorney General in 1986, but lost in the Republican primary to incumbent Robert Spire 53%–47%.

State Attorney General (1991–2003)

Elections 
In 1990, he ran for Attorney General again. In the Republican primary, he won with a plurality of 38%. In the general election, he defeated Democrat Gene Crump 54%–46%. He won re-election in 1994 (67%) and 1998 (68%).

Tenure 
Stenberg was the named defendant in the noted Supreme Court abortion case, Stenberg v. Carhart 530 U.S. 914 (2000).

1996 U.S. Senate election 

Stenberg first ran for the U.S. Senate in 1996 to succeed retiring Democratic U.S. Senator J. James Exon. Initially seen as the frontrunner, he was defeated by business executive Chuck Hagel 62%–38%. Hagel went on to win an upset against Democratic Governor Ben Nelson.

2000 U.S. Senate election 

After being re-elected Attorney General in 1998, Stenberg again ran for the U.S. Senate in 2000 to succeed retiring Democratic U.S. Senator Bob Kerrey. He won the six candidate primary with 50% of the vote. In one of the closest elections in Nebraska history, Nelson defeated Stenberg 51%–49%, even as Republican presidential nominee George W. Bush won the state with 62%.

Post-Attorney General career (2003–present)

Private sector 
Stenberg left office as Attorney General in 2003 and returned to work in the private sector as of counsel at Erickson and Sederstrom, the same firm where his former boss, Charles Thone, is a partner.

2006 U.S. Senate election 

In 2006, Stenberg launched his third bid for the U.S. Senate. Once again, an early frontrunner, he was defeated by former Ameritrade chief operating officer Pete Ricketts 48%–38%. Ricketts went on to lose to incumbent U.S. Senator Nelson.

State Treasurer 
In 2010, Stenberg ran for Nebraska State Treasurer to succeed retiring Shane Osborn. He won the primary over state Senator Tony Fulton 52%–28% and won the general election with 73% of the vote.

2012 U.S. Senate election

In 2011, he announced his intention to run for the U.S. Senate a fourth time.

After receiving endorsements from Club for Growth and Freedomworks, Stenberg split the Tea Party vote with attorney general Jon Brunning. Stenberg came in third place, taking 18.8% of the vote. The nomination went to State senator Deb Fischer.

2014 election

Following the withdrawal of the two leading candidates for the Republican nomination for Governor, Stenberg said that he would consider "what is the best way to serve the state of Nebraska". He has said that it was "unlikely, but possible" that he would run for Governor. He also considered running for the open U.S. Senate seat, but decided instead to run for re-election to a second term as Treasurer.

Personal life
He is married to Sue Hoegemeyer of Hooper, Nebraska. They have been married 39 years and have four children.

Electoral history

References

External links
 
 

|-

|-

1948 births
21st-century American politicians
Harvard Business School alumni
Harvard Law School alumni
Living people
Nebraska Attorneys General
Nebraska lawyers
Nebraska Republicans
People from Tekamah, Nebraska
State treasurers of Nebraska
University of Nebraska–Lincoln alumni